Die Mannequin is a Canadian alternative rock band from Toronto, founded by guitar player and singer Care Failure (born Caroline Kawa) in 2005. The band has toured across Canada several times, opening for Buckcherry, Guns N' Roses,  Marilyn Manson and Sum 41.  They have also toured Europe on several occasions, alone and as an opening act for Danko Jones in 2008.

History
Rising from the ashes of Care Failure's first four-piece band "The Bloody Mannequins", Die Mannequin started in the spring of 2006 when Failure recorded her first EP, How to Kill, on How To Kill Records/Cordless Recordings. She sang, played guitar and bass on this EP because she did not have a permanent backing band at that time. Death from Above 1979's Jesse F. Keeler took care of the drum duties as well as production. The E.P. featured four songs and was produced by Keeler and partner Al-P from MSTRKRFT and was mastered by Ryan Mills at Joao Carvalho Mastering. Care Failure was also a member of the supergroup The Big Dirty Band, which included members from the Canadian hardrock band Rush, amongst others. They have recorded a cover version and video of The Bobby Fuller Four song I Fought The Law. This video also featured Anthony Useless, even though he did not play on any of the recordings. It was featured as a soundtrack to the 2006 movie Trailer Park Boys: The Movie.

Failure later hired two of her longtime friends, Ethan Deth (of Toronto band Kïll Cheerleadër) and Pat M. (a.k.a. Ghostwolf), to play bass and drums. Deth was quickly replaced by Anthony "Useless" Bleed, also from Kïll Cheerleadër. He played bass guitar and provided backing vocals. Managed by Shull Management, Die Mannequin signed with EMI Publishing in the summer of 2006, and began their own record label, How To Kill Records which is distributed by Warner Music Canada. They were booked as one of the opening bands for Guns N' Roses' eastern leg of their 2006 North-American tour.

Die Mannequin released a new EP in the fall of 2007 entitled Slaughter Daughter. Two tracks, "Do It Or Die" and "Saved By Strangers", were produced by Ian D'Sa of Billy Talent. The other two tracks, "Upside Down Cross" and "Lonely Of A Woman", were produced by Junior Sanchez. There was also a live recording of "Open Season" included on this EP. The band released a video for the first single, "Do it or Die", which entered rotation on Much Music and Much Loud.

Both EPs have been collected on a single disc entitled Unicorn Steak which features two unreleased songs: an early demo of "Empty's Promise" and the cover of the Beatsteaks song Hand in Hand. A video was also recorded after the release of Unicorn Steak, for the song "Saved By Strangers", directed by Canadian director Bruce McDonald. He has also directed a documentary about Die Mannequin, entitled The Rawside of Die Mannequin, which premiered at Toronto's North By North East festival on June 15, 2008.

In 2009 Die Mannequin took part in a documentary series called City Sonic.  The series, which featured 20 Toronto artists, had Care Failure reflecting on her memories of CFNY, 102.1 the Edge.

On September 8, 2009, Die Mannequin released FINO + BLEED, mixed by Mike Fraser.

In 2009, they opened for the Canadians dates of the Marilyn Manson's The High End of Low Tour.

On March 21, 2012, Die Mannequin announced on their website that they would be releasing new music mid April, along with a new single and music video. This coincided with the release of Hard Core Logo 2.

On August 20, 2014, the band released a single for their upcoming album, titled "Sucker Punch". Their second full-length album, Neon Zero  was released on October 28, 2014. Exclaim! Magazine called it 'evil dance metal'.

Members
Current members
Caroline "Care Failure" Kawa - vocals, guitar, bass (2005–present)
Kevvy Mental - bass, backing vocals (2015–present)
Keith Heppler - drums, percussion (2015–present)
J.C. Sandoval - guitar, backing vocals (2015–present)
Former members
Anthony "Useless" Bleed - bass, backing vocals (2006–2014)
Dazzer Scott - drums, percussion (2009–2014)
Stacy Stray - guitar, backing vocals (2009–2014)
Ethan Kath - bass (2006)
Ghostwolf - drums, percussion (2006–2009)

Session members
Jesse F. Keeler - drums, percussion (on How To Kill EP)
Jack Irons - drums, percussion (on Fino + Bleed)

Discography
Die Mannequin has released two recognized albums to date and two EPs.

Singles

Studio albums
Fino + Bleed (2009)
Neon Zero (2014)

Compilations
Unicorn Steak (2008)

EPs
How To Kill (2006)
Slaughter Daughter (2007)
Danceland (2012) No. 76 CAN

Soundtracks

Interviews
Die Mannequin gets darker and warns of Toronto rapist - From Torontomusicscene.ca

See also

Music of Canada
Canadian rock
List of Canadian musicians
List of bands from Canada
:Category:Canadian musical groups

References

External links
Care Failure Interview – Truth Mag
Die Mannequin Neon Zero

Musical groups established in 2005
Musical groups from Toronto
Canadian punk rock groups
Canadian alternative rock groups
Cordless Recordings artists
2005 establishments in Ontario